Connolly is a small village located in west County Clare, Ireland. It is 14 kilometres west south west of Ennis. The village is located on the R474 Ennis–Milltown Malbay road.

Amenities in the village include a post office, the Roman Catholic church, and national school (founded 1905), located in the centre of the village. Other amenities include a shop/petrol station, a pub and an art gallery. Connolly also formerly (in the 1940s) had a creamery and a Garda station.

See also 
 List of towns and villages in Ireland

References

External links
 St Michael the Archangel Church Profile (archived 2014)

Towns and villages in County Clare